Jay Johnston may refer to:
Jay Johnston (born 1968), American actor and comedian
Jay Johnston (ice hockey) (1958), retired Canadian NHL defenceman

See also
Jay Johnstone (1945–2020), American former professional baseball player
Jay Johnson (disambiguation)